The 1994 World Men's Curling Championships was held at the Eisstadion in Oberstdorf, Germany from April 10–17, 1994.

Teams

Round-robin standings

Round-robin results

Draw 1

Draw 2

Draw 3

Draw 4

Draw 5

Draw 6

Draw 7

Draw 8

Draw 9

Tiebreakers

Playoffs

Final

References
 

Curling
World Mens Curling Championship, 1994
World Men's Curling Championship
April 1994 sports events in Europe
1994 in Bavaria
Sports competitions in Oberstdorf
International curling competitions hosted by Germany